Potugadu (English: Hero) is a 2013 Indian Telugu language film directed by Pavan Wadeyar. It is a remake of the 2012 Kannada film Govindaya Namaha, also directed by Wadeyar with starring Komal. It was produced by Sirisha and Sridhar under the Ramalakshmi Cine Creations banner. The film has four heroines, Sakshi Chowdhary, Simran Kaur Mundi, Rachel and Anupriya Goenka. Achu scored the music, and two tunes from the Kannada film - including the "Pyarge Aagbittaite" - were used in the Telugu version. The shooting was wrapped up in a single extensive schedule and the post-production work was simultaneously in progress. Reportedly Potugadu was going to be the biggest movie in terms of budget in Manoj's career. The film released on 14 September 2013 and was declared a 'semi-hit' at the box office.

Plot
Govinda Naama Sastry is a young man who decides to kill himself. He goes to a lonely spot and decides to have one last drink. At about the same time, Venkata Rathnam also comes to the same spot to kill himself. The two sit down for a chat to find out more about their respective life stories.

While Venkata Rathnam decides to die as his lover ditched him, Govinda has four love stories to narrate. First up is his romantic track with Vaidehi, the daughter of a rich Brahmin. After a brief courtship, the love story fails because Vaidehi's father is against the alliance. Govinda moves on in life and this is where the second love story begins. He falls in love with Mumtaz and romance blossoms between them. However, Govinda throws away everything in a drunken stupor, where he makes some derogatory comments about Mumtaz.

Venkata Rathnam gets furious and tries to bash Govinda. Govinda vomits blood admitting that he had poison mixed in the drink. Venkata Rathnam takes him to a hospital and gets him treated by a doctor. Mumtaz is working there as a nurse which is not known to either Govinda or Venkata Rathnam. Mumtaz hides behind a wall and starts listening to Govinda's story.

Next up is a love story with a foreigner named Stacy who is engaged to his boss. In order to steal her ring costing 500,000 rupees he separates the couple but he ditches her after he learns that she threw the ring into a river out of frustration. The last and final love story involves Mary. For the first time in his life, Govinda experiences true love. He fully reforms himself and leads a normal life. But Mary runs a brothel and traffics girls. Upon hearing this from the police, Govinda is heartbroken.

On hiring Govinda for a job, Mary tells him that her task is upbringing talented girls from towns and his job is to transport them to her house. In the present, Govinda is informed by the police regarding this and after pleading strongly, police accept Govinda's favor in helping them in releasing the girls. The girls, all of them transported by Govinda, are in a container and after much bloodshed Govinda rescues all of them. Dejected and heartbroken by the betrayal and the sins he committed he decides to die.

Govinda and Venkata Rathnam go out of the hospital and watch Vaidehi being taken to a room for her delivery and his boss along with his parents. Before suicide, Govinda tells Venkata Rathnam that he left Vaidehi as he was aware that if they eloped, her parents would have killed themselves, and that he separated his boss and Stacy as his boss would desert his parents after his marriage with her which didn't happen because of him.

Mumtaz stops Govinda as Govinda confesses to Venkata Rathnam that Mumtaz was the only girl who showered unconditional love on him and he abandoned her in a drunken state. The pair reconciles and a frustrated Venkata Rathnam leaves the hospital with the hope of gaining love. He accidentally comes across a beautiful girl who accepts his proposal.

Cast
 Manchu Manoj as Govinda Naama Sastry
 Sakshi Chaudhary as Mumtaz
 Simran Kaur Mundi as Vaidehi
 Posani Krishna Murali as Venkata Rathnam
 Rachel Louise Wise as Stacy
 Anupriya Goenka as Mary
 Sayaji Shinde as Mumtaz's father
 Chandra Mohan as Neelakanta Shastri
 Y. Kasi Viswanath as Gangadhar
 Geetha Singh as Jambavathi
 Satyam Rajesh as Mallesh
 Shiva Shankar Master as Vaidehi's dance master
 Raghu Babu
 Narsing Yadav
 Thagubothu Ramesh 
 Srinivasa Reddy

Music

Achu composed the music for the film. The soundtrack album, officially released by Aditya Music, consists of 10 tracks, two of which were re-used from the original. The audio was launched in Hyderabad on 25 August 2013.

Release
Potugadu was awarded an 'A' certificate by the censor board, which recommended a few cuts to the movie.

The film released in 550 screens worldwide.

Critical reception
The film opened to mixed reviews from critics. Andhra Wishesh rated the film 3.5/5 and said the film "has lots of love stories woven into one product. Go watch it for some light fun and good laughs." 123Telugu.com rated the film 3/5 and stated, "'Potugadu' has a very entertaining and racy first half. But it is let down by a loud and clichéd second half. You can safely watch the film once, for the crackling performances from Manoj and Posani as well as for some great songs." Oneindia rated the film 3/5 and stated, "Potugadu is a wonderful comedy entertainer, which has best performances, rich production and interesting script. Manoj and Pavan are sure to get a big break from this film. It is a mass entertainer. Don't miss it to watch this weekend." Great Andhra gave the film 2.5/5 and said the film "progresses at a brisk pace and ends in two hours. That is a huge plus for the movie. Otherwise, one would have had to suffer Manoj’s excesses for a longer time and that would have negatively impacted the film. Those who can tolerate 'loud comedy' and bear Manoj’s over action, can watch Potugadu once. Given that it’s a low budget flick with double meaning dialogues and good music, it might end up being a safe film at the box office. It is what one can term as an 'ok' movie. Surely, you won’t miss anything in case you decide to skip watching it! Watch it at your own risk!" Telugu Mirchi rated the film 2.25/5 and stated, "The ratings and analysis of the above reviews do not reflect the opinion of the audience. It is merely the reviewer’s perception and has no connection with the box office collections whatsoever." Rediff.com gave the film 2/5 and stated, "The film may appeal to those who enjoy double entendres and crude entertainment. Others can happily give it a miss." Deccan Chronicle rated the film 1.5/5 and called it a waste of time.

Box office
The film opened with 45% - 60% occupancy on the first day and collected  68.8 million. It surpassed the collection of the previous blockbuster film Manoj in just two days of its release. The film on its first weekend collected  220 million at the box office. Despite political issues, the film had a strong collection in its first week,  350 million at the box office. The film became the biggest hit ever in Manoj's career.

References

External links
 

2013 films
2010s Telugu-language films
Telugu remakes of Kannada films
Films scored by Achu Rajamani
Films directed by Pavan Wadeyar